Dil Ki Baazi is a 1993 Indian Hindi drama film directed by Anil Ganguly. It stars Akshay Kumar, Ayesha Jhulka, Avinash Wadhavan, Farheen in lead roles.

Plot 
Ajay is a rich, spoilt brat who falls in love with Asha, who has held all the responsibilities of her family on her shoulders. Vijay is a middle-class man searching for jobs who loves Aarti. Ajay and Vijay hate each other. Aarti's father gets Vijay a job in the same company where he was working, unaware of the fact that it's Ajay's father's company. Ajay tries to get him fired, but fails every time. It is revealed that Ajay and Vijay are step-brothers. Ajay's father left Vijay's mom Nirmala to marry Ajay's mom for money. He tells the truth to Ajay and asks him to promise that he will find his brother and his mother and will give them equal share in the property. Meanwhile, Vijay realises that Ajay is his step-brother and seeks revenge for his mother. He join hands with Ajay's rivals in order to destroy Ajay. He overhears Ajay's conversation with his mom where he says that he wants to give half of his property to his stepbrother and mother whom he is trying to find for so many days. Vijay realises his mistake and forgives Ajay. Some goons attack Ajay's mom and the boys take revenge on Bhogilal, who killed Ajay's grandfather. Both brothers unite after so many years. The story ends with Ajay's mother dying and asks Nirmala Devi to accept both her sons. The live together as a family then.

Cast

 Raakhee as Nirmala Devi
 Akshay Kumar as Vijay Kashyap
 Ayesha Jhulka as Aarti
 Avinash Wadhavan as Ajay Kashyap
 Farheen as Asha
 Anupam Kher as Daulatram
 Paresh Rawal as Santosh Kumar / Bhogilal
 Navin Nischol as Vishwanath Kashyap
 Anju Mahendru as Lalita Kashyap
 Anu Kapoor as Bihari
 Laxmikant Berde as Prem Murali
 Ajit Vachhani as Lawyer Vachhani
Suresh Chatwal as Suresh 
 Viju Khote as Police Constable
 Dinesh Hingoo as Taxi Driver
 Mac Mohan as Santosh Henchman
 Gurbachan Singh as Santosh Henchman

Soundtrack

References

External links
 

1993 films
1990s Hindi-language films
Films scored by Raamlaxman
Films directed by Anil Ganguly
Indian action drama films